Radoslava Bachvarova (Bulgarian: Радослава Бъчварова) (born 19 January 1987) is a Bulgarian female basketball player. Bachvarova graduated from Virginia Commonwealth University in 2009. She was a member of the Bulgarian National team.

External links
Profile at eurobasket.com

1987 births
Living people
Sportspeople from Ruse, Bulgaria
Bulgarian women's basketball players
Shooting guards